Pulitzer is a surname. Notable people with the surname include:

Henry F. Pulitzer (1899–1979), Austrian-born English art dealer
Joseph Pulitzer (1847–1911), American newspaper publisher and journalist
Joseph Pulitzer Jr. (1913–1993), American newspaper publisher, grandson of Joseph
Lilly Pulitzer (1931–2013), American socialite and fashion designer
Lisa Pulitzer (born c. 1962), author and journalist
Patsy Pulitzer (1928–2011), American model and socialite, granddaughter of Joseph
Ralph Pulitzer (1879–1939), son of Joseph
Roxanne Pulitzer (born 1951), American socialite, actress, novelist